"Get Out of the House!" is a song by Australian band, Boom Crash Opera. The song was released in September 1989 as the second single from their second studio album, These Here Are Crazy Times! (1989).

Track listing
 7" 
 "Get Out of the House"  (Boom Crash Opera) - 3:16
 "Thinking in Slow Motion" (Richard Pleasance) - 3:26

 CD Maxi
 "Get Out of the House" (Boom Crash Opera) - 3:16
 "Onion Skin"  (Extended Mix) - 5:05
 "Thinking in Slow Motion" - 3:26
 "Four Sunny Days Out of Seven" - 4:16
12 inch single
 Get Out of the House (Extended Version) (Boom Crash Opera) - 5:39
 Thinking in Slow Motion (Richard Pleasance) - 3:26
 Four Sunny Days Out of Seven - 4:16

Charts

References

External links 
Boom Crash Opera website

1989 singles
1989 songs
Boom Crash Opera songs
Songs written by Richard Pleasance